Nema problema  is a 2004 Italian film directed by Giancarlo Bocchi.

Plot
Lorenzi, a war correspondent, ventures into a Balkan territory contended by various warring factions. He is accompanied by Aldo Puhar, a local translator, with the purpose of unmasking a certain “Commander Jako”, who is believed to be responsible for the disappearance of an entire convoy of refugees.
Due to a series of events, two young people join them, Maxime, a young journalist of strong ideals, and Sanja, a local girl desperately searching for her missing relatives. With good fortune, the four manage to enter the city of Vaku, currently under siege. Regardless of all the dangers they've gone through together, the four are irreversibly estranged by misunderstandings and suspicions.

Cast
Žan Marolt - Aldo Jako
Labina Mitevska - Sanja K.
Vincent Riotta - Anselmo Lorenzi
Fabrizio Rongione - Maxime

External links

Official site

2004 films
2000s Italian-language films
English-language Italian films
2000s Italian films